General Chandrika Srilal Weerasooriya, RWP, RSP, VSV, USP was a senior Sri Lankan army officer. He was the 15th Commander of the Sri Lankan Army and a former Sri Lankan High Commissioner to Pakistan.

Early life and education
Weerasooriya was educated at S. Thomas' College, Mount Lavinia. He is Arnolis Weerasooriya's great-grand nephew and a member of the Weerasooriya family of Dodanduwa and Hikkaduwa.

Military career
He joined the Ceylon Army in 1963 as a Cadet officer and attended the Pakistan Military Academy. On his return to Ceylon in 1965, he was commissioned as a second lieutenant in the 4th Field Artillery Regiment, Ceylon Artillery. He later qualified as an Instructor Gunnery (IG). Promoted to lieutenant colonel, he went on to serve as the commanding officer, 4th Field Artillery Regiment from March 1985 to March 1987.

He was the Brigade Commander of the Artillery Brigade from November 1991 to December 1993. He attended the National Defence College, India and was promoted to the rank of major general in 1994, serving as Commander, Task Force 1 from December 1994 to September 1995. He served as Colonel Commandant, Sri Lankan Artillery from 1997 to 1998. Having served in many commands and operations in the Sri Lanka Army, including Operation Leap Forward, Director of Operations and Chief of Staff of the Army, he was appointed on 16 December 1998 as the Commander of the Sri Lankan Army with the rank of lieutenant general and held the position until his retirement on 24 August 2000 following the Second Battle of Elephant Pass. He was promoted to the rank of general on retirement and was succeeded by L. P. Balagalle.

Awards and decorations
He has received some of the highest awards in the Sri Lankan armed forces, which includes the Rana Wickrama Padakkama, Uttama Seva Padakkama and the Rana Sura Padakkama. He was awarded the Sitara-e-Pakistan (Star of Pakistan) by the Government of Pakistan.

Later life
In 2000 he was appointed as Sri Lankan High Commissioner to Pakistan and served in this capacity for six years. He was awarded the Sitara-e-Pakistan the highest of civil decoration given by the Government of Pakistan in 2011. Since his return to Sri Lanka he has served as an independent non-executive director of Ceylinco Life PLC since 2010.

References

Commanders of the Sri Lanka Army
Sri Lankan full generals
Sinhalese military personnel
Sri Lankan diplomats
Pakistan Military Academy alumni
High Commissioners of Sri Lanka to Pakistan
Alumni of S. Thomas' College, Mount Lavinia
Sri Lankan Christians
Recipients of the Sitara-e-Pakistan
Sri Lanka Artillery officers
1943 births
Living people
National Defence College, India alumni